The Diocese of Ponta Grossa is a territorial division of the Catholic Church in the state of Paraná, Brazil. It was created in 1926 by Papal bull Quum in Dies Numerus of Pope Pius XI, with bula Quum in numerus. It is a suffragan diocese of Archdiocese of Curitiba. The fifth and current Diocesan Bishop is Bishop Sergio Arthur Braschi.

Bishops 

Antônio Mazzarotto (1929 – 1965)
Geraldo Luis Claudio Micheleto Pellanda, C.P. (1965 – 1991)
Murilo Sebastian Ramos Krieger, S.C.I. (1991 – 1998), appointed Archbishop of Maringá, Parana
Joao Braz de Aviz (1998 – 2003), appointed	Archbishop of Maringá, Parana; future Cardinal
Sérgio Arthur Braschi (2003 – present)

It is the largest centre of vocations throughout the Paraná, responsible for 40% of all priests present in Parana.

Coadjutor bishop
Geraldo Claudio Luiz Micheletto Pellanda, C.P. (1960-1965)

Auxiliary bishops
Getúlio Teixeira Guimarães, S.V.D. (1980-1984), appointed Bishop of Cornélio Procópio, Parana
José Alves da Costa, D.C. (1986-1991), appointed	Bishop of Corumbá, Mato Grosso do Sul

Other priests of this diocese who became bishops
Francisco Carlos Bach, appointed Bishop of Toledo, Parana in 2005
Mário Spaki, appointed Bishop of Paranavaí, Parana in 2018

Cities 
The Diocese of Ponta Grossa is composed of 13 cities: Carambeí, Castro, Imbituva, Ipiranga, Ponta Grossa, Telêmaco Borba, Ortigueira, Reserva, Tibagi, Ivaí, Piraí do Sul, Teixeira Soares, Fernandes Pinheiro, Ventania, Irati, Guamiranga, and Imbaú.

References 

 Wikipedia: Diocese de Ponta Grossa
GCatholic.org
 Diocese Website

Roman Catholic Diocese
Roman Catholic dioceses in Brazil
Ponta Grossa, Roman Catholic Diocese of
Roman Catholic Diocese
Roman Catholic dioceses and prelatures established in the 20th century
Roman Catholic Diocese